The Macintosh SE/30 is a personal computer designed, manufactured and sold by Apple Computer from January 1989 to October 1991. It is the fastest of the original black-and-white compact Macintosh series.

The SE/30 has a black-and-white monitor and a single Processor Direct Slot (rather than the NuBus slots of the IIx, with which the SE/30 shares a common architecture) which supported third-party accelerators, network cards, or a display adapter. The SE/30 could expand up to 128 MB of RAM (a significant amount of RAM at the time), and included a 40 or 80 MB hard drive. It was also the first compact Mac to include a 1.44 MB high density floppy disk drive as standard (late versions of the SE had one, but earlier versions did not). The power of the SE/30 was demonstrated by its use to produce the This Week newspaper, the first colour tabloid newspaper in the UK to use new, digital pre-press technology on a personal, desktop computer. In keeping with Apple's practice, from the Apple II+ until the Power Macintosh G3 was announced, a logic board upgrade was available for US$1,699 to convert a regular SE to an SE/30. The SE would then have exactly the same specs as an SE/30, with the difference only in the floppy drive if the SE had an 800 KB drive. The set included a new front bezel to replace the original SE bezel with that of an SE/30.

Although this machine was succeeded in Q4 of 1990 by the Macintosh Classic, the SE/30 wasn't discontinued until 1991 by the Macintosh Classic II, which despite featuring the same processor and clock speed, was only 60% as fast as the SE/30 due to its 16-bit data path, supported no more than 10 MB of memory, lacked an internal expansion slot, and made the Motorola 68882 FPU an optional upgrade.

Hardware

Although it uses 32-bit instructions, the SE/30 ROM, like the IIx ROM, includes some code using 24-bit addressing, rendering the ROM "32-bit dirty". This limited the actual amount of RAM that can be accessed to 8 MB under System 6.0.8. A system extension called MODE32 enables access to installed extra memory under System 6.0.8. Under System 7.0 up to System 7.5.5 the SE/30 can use up to 128 MB of RAM.  Alternatively, replacing the ROM SIMM with one from a Mac IIsi or Mac IIfx makes the SE/30 "32-bit clean" and thereby enables use of up to 128 MB RAM and System 7.5 through OS 7.6.1.

A standard SE/30 can run up to System 7.5.5, since Mac OS 7.6 requires a "32-bit clean" ROM.

Additionally, the SE/30 can run A/UX, Apple's older version of Unix that was able to run Macintosh programs.

Though there was no official upgrade path for the SE/30, several third-party processor upgrades were available. A 68040 upgrade made it possible to run Mac OS 8.1, which extended the SE/30's productive life for many more years. 
Also extending the useful life of the SE30 were Micron Technology video cards.  Three cards were available, which fit into the SE/30's Processor Direct Slot: the 8-bit Gray-Scale 30, the SE/306-48, 640x480 resolution 8-bit color, and SE/3010-78 1024x768 resolution 8-bit color.  With the first, the internal display was 8-bit greyscale; the latter two were used with 13" and 14", respectively, external color monitors, while retaining 1-bit (black and white) on the internal monitor.

Models
 Macintosh SE/30: Available in multiple configurations.
 : 1 MB RAM, No hard disk
 : 1 MB RAM, 40 MB hard disk
 : 4 MB RAM, 80 MB hard disk

Reception
Bruce F. Webster wrote in Macworld in March 1989 that the SE/30 did not "break new ground. It does, however, establish Apple's commitment to the classic Mac product line, and it provides users with an Apple-supported alternative to either a small, slow Mac or a large, powerful one. More important, it fills a gap in the Macintosh family ... a new level of power and portability for the Macintosh community". 

In a January 2009 Macworld feature commemorating the 25th anniversary of the Macintosh, three industry commentators – Adam C. Engst of TidBITS, John Gruber of Daring Fireball, and John Siracusa of Ars Technica – chose the SE/30 as their favorite Mac model of all time. "Like any great Mac," wrote Gruber, "the SE/30 wasn't just a terrific system just when it debuted; it remained eminently usable for years to come. When I think of the original Mac era, the machine in my mind is the SE/30."

The SE/30 remains popular with hobbyists, and has been described as “the best computer Apple will ever make,” with used models selling for a significant premium relative to other machines of the era. Contemporary PDS upgrades allowed an SE/30's internal monitor to be upgraded to support 256 shades of gray (the only original-design Macintosh to support such an upgrade) or a 68040 processor, and the SE/30's standard RAM limit of 128 MB greatly exceeded even that of much later models such as the Color Classic and Macintosh LC II.  In 2018, add-ons and software became available to add WiFi and even make the SE/30 work as a remote control for Spotify.

In popular culture
In the NBC TV series Seinfeld, Jerry has an SE/30 sitting on his desk during the first seasons. This would be the first of many Macs to occupy the desk, including a PowerBook Duo and a Twentieth Anniversary Macintosh.

In the FX series It's Always Sunny in Philadelphia, the Waitress is seen with a Macintosh SE/30 on her bedroom desk in the episode "The Gang Gives Back".

In the film Watchmen, Ozymandias has an all-black TEMPEST-shielded SE/30 on his desk.

Timeline

References

SE 30
SE 30
SE 30
Computer-related introductions in 1989

sv:Macintosh SE#SE/30